The ASPRO chronology is a nine-period dating system of the ancient Near East used by the Maison de l'Orient et de la Méditerranée for archaeological sites aged between 14,000 and 5,700 BP.

First published in 1994, ASPRO stands for the "Atlas des sites du Proche-Orient" (Atlas of Near East archaeological sites), a French publication pioneered by Francis Hours and developed by other scholars such as Olivier Aurenche.

The periods, cultures, features and date ranges of the original ASPRO chronology are shown below:

In 2001, the institute revised the chronology of the first six periods based on newer carbon data and calibration curves.  In Period 3 an early and late phase could be distinguished, but Periods 4 and 5 were merged. Overall they found more overlap in time between different cultural phases between different sites.

See also
Ancient Near East
Neolithic

References

External links
 Website of MOM
 Atlas des sites Prochaine-Orient 14000 et 5700 BP - MOM's online application - Atlas of Near East Archaeological Sites 14000 to 5700 BP

1994 introductions
Ancient Near East
Neolithic
Chronology